Dryopteris crinalis is a species of fern known as the serpent woodfern. It is endemic to Hawaii, where it is known from the main islands.

There are at least two varieties. The var. podosorus was federally listed as an endangered species of the United States in 2010. There are three populations on Kauai, for a total of no more than 47 individual plants. The fern grows on walls of basalt in wet forests.

References

External links
USDA Plants Profile for Dryopteris crinalis

crinalis
Native ferns of Hawaii
Endemic flora of Hawaii
Biota of Hawaii (island)